The Chaddi Baniyan Gangs (also known as the Kachcha Baniyan Gangs) are criminal groups operating in parts of India. Gang members perform attacks while wearing only their underwear, which is the source of their name (in the local language, chaddi, or kachcha are underpants and baniyan is undershirts). In addition to wearing undergarments, members wear face masks and cover themselves in oil or mud to protect their identities.

Attacks
The gangs tend to move in groups of 5-10 people, and wear a kurta and lungi. During the day, they gather at transport hubs or disused urban spaces. They conceal themselves as beggars or common labourers to identify potential houses to rob. Before moving on to a different town, the gangs attempt to steal from multiple homes.

Gang members tie up family members, during robberies, and murder anyone who resists. They often arm themselves with rods, axes, knives, and firearms. When they rob a house, they sometimes eat and leave their excrements.

The gang members often rent cars to get around, and are suspected of robbing temples.

Identity
In several cases, members of the gang have been identified as members of the Phase Pardhi tribe. In some instances, the culprits have included members of the Pardhi community as well as some others.

Incidents
Gang activity has been reported since 1987. They have been active in Uttarakhand, Uttar Pradesh, Madhya Pradesh, Haryana, Delhi, Rajasthan, and Andhra Pradesh.

Arrests
Four members of a Chaddi Baniyan Gang were arrested in Mumbai in an encounter with Mumbai Police on April 4, 2016.

In February 2016, Chaddi Baniyan gang members were arrested after a siege with police at Borivali.

In popular culture 
In the second season of the Indian drama anthology series Delhi Crime (released in 2022), Chaddi Baniyan Gang members are suspected of committing a string of murders in Delhi.

See also
 Kala Kaccha Gang

References

Organised crime groups in India
Crime in Punjab, India